Edward Lebler (born 20 May 1958) is an Austrian ice hockey player. He competed in the men's tournaments at the 1984 Winter Olympics and the 1988 Winter Olympics.

Career statistics

References

External links
 

1958 births
Living people
Austrian ice hockey players
EC KAC players
EC Red Bull Salzburg players
EC VSV players
EK Zell am See players
Olympic ice hockey players of Austria
Ice hockey players at the 1984 Winter Olympics
Ice hockey players at the 1988 Winter Olympics
Sportspeople from British Columbia
NCAA men's ice hockey national champions
Wisconsin Badgers men's ice hockey players
20th-century Austrian people